Marshall Township is one of nine townships in Lawrence County, Indiana, United States. As of the 2010 census, its population was 4,660 and it contained 2,038 housing units.

History
Marshall Township was named for John Marshall, fourth Chief Justice of the United States.

Geography

Unincorporated towns
 Avoca at 
 Coveyville at 
 Guthrie at 
 Judah at 
 Logan at 
 Murdock at 
 Needmore at 
 Peerless at 
 Stemm at 
 Thornton at 
(This list is based on USGS data and may include former settlements.)

Cemeteries
The township contains these six cemeteries: Anderson, Brinegar, Hayes, Hopkins, Mount Zion and Perkins.

Marshall Township Park
The Avoca State Fish Hatchery was built in 1819 and first served as a grist mill until 1919, when it was purchased by the DNR, who began building ponds in 1923. The Hatchery stocked Indiana’s waters with fish for years until it was decommissioned by the DNR in 2013 and fell into disrepair. 

Bedford Mayor Shawna Girgis, requested Bedford Park Director, Barry Jeskewich, to find a solution to restore this historical location for Lawrence County. Barry Jeskewich partnered with James Farmer, Indiana University Substaining Hoosier Communities to obtained a grant to preserve this beloved green space for the surrounding community. The grant was awarded to the newly formed Avoca Park and Recreation board in 2019. Avoca State Fish Hatchery was renamed Marshall Township Park and is now in the hands of board and the local community.

“IU Farmer-Jeskewich Final Report”

Major highways
  Indiana State Road 37
  Indiana State Road 54

School districts
 North Lawrence Community Schools
Lawrence County Independent School

Political districts
 Indiana's 4th congressional district
 State House District 65
 State Senate District 44

References
 
 United States Census Bureau 2008 TIGER/Line Shapefiles
 IndianaMap
 "Acquisition still in Progress"
 "Funding the Park"
 "IU Farmer-Jeskewich Final Report"

External links
 Indiana Township Association
 United Township Association of Indiana
 City-Data.com page for Marshall Township

Townships in Lawrence County, Indiana
Townships in Indiana